Civilizing the Economy: A New Economics of Provision is a book on the role of the economy in social relations by Marvin Brown, published in 2010. Civilizing the Economy exposes the role of the atlantic slave trade in early capitalism. In place of Adam Smith's myth of the invisible hand, Brown focuses on the slave owner's hands that created the wealth that Smith enjoyed. He then proposes a new framework that places the economy within the context of social relations, and demonstrates how we can transform social systems into an economy that provides for all.  The book has been called “a must read in redefining capitalism.”

Reception and Reviews

Noted business leader in sustainability, Ray Anderson wrote of the work:

As we humans puzzle our way to an understanding of how to live sustainably within Earth’s carrying capacity, Marvin Brown has provided a crucial piece of the puzzle. Civilizing the Economy is an important book because it expresses a keystone idea of the new economic system that must evolve if our species is to survive and live up to its potential.

Georges Enderle, John T. Ryan, Jr. Professor of International Business Ethics at Mendoza College of Business, University of Notre Dame, made the following comment on Brown's book:

In the current debate about the future of capitalism, Marvin Brown provides essential benchmarks to separate the wheat from the chaff in moving toward a civilized economy...  This book is a must read in redefining capitalism.

James O'Toole, Daniels Distinguished Professor of Business Ethics, University of Denver stated of the book:

In this profound and courageous book, Marvin Brown asks the question that moral philosophers and political economists have pondered since Socrates: What is a just society? In a spirit similar to E.F. Schumacher’s ‘economics as if people mattered’, he limns a bold, fresh and scholarly vision of a new civilized economic order with a fairer distribution of income, wealth, and goods.

Debate and criticism

In addition to praise for the book's value, Heidi Garrett-Peltier in the journal Peace Review noted that the book doesn't provide detail on practical steps;

The book offers a model for discussion, an alternative narrative for shaping the way we view economic interaction. It does not provide practical solutions for how to transition from our current economic paradigm to one based on a different value system. In this respect, Brown leaves the reader yearning for more.

See also

 Business ethics
 Neoclassical economics
 New Economy Coalition
 Adam Smith
 Political economy

References

External links
 Civilizing the Economy

Economics books
2010 non-fiction books
Cambridge University Press books